Dig Deeper: The Disappearance of Birgit Meier is a 2021 German true crime documentary miniseries, about the disappearance of Birgit Meier in 1989 and the investigation of it.

Episodes

References

External links
 
 

2020s German television series
2021 German television series debuts
German documentary television series
German-language Netflix original programming
Netflix original documentary television series